The Presbyterian Church of Grace (in Portuguese Igreja Presbiteriana da Graça ) is a denomination of orientation Pentecostal, founded on October 8, 1995, in Mogi das Cruzes , São Paulo from a group of dissident members of the Presbyterian Church of Brazil, who adhered to the Pentecostal doctrine of Baptism with the Holy Spirit as the second blessing, after conversion. Despite adopting the Presbyterian name, it has no link with the doctrine Presbyterian, nor with the Presbyterian form of government, being the Episcopalism adopted.

The church is adept at the so-called Vision of the Five Ministries which constitutes, among other elements, in the ordination of contemporary apostles,
 which is completely rejected by traditional Presbyterian denominations and generally adopted by neopentecostal denominations It has congregations spread throughout Brazil and also in Nepal.

History 
The denomination emerged on October 8, 1995, in Mogi das Cruzes, São Paulo from a group of members of Igreja Presbiteriana do Brasil who claimed to have been baptized by the Holy Spirit, seeking to form a church Pentecostal. From the growth of the main church, several churches were founded in other locations in Mogi das Cruzes and later in neighboring cities.

With the expansion of the denomination, it already had about 14 churches in 2016.

The current head office is located in Mogi das Cruzes, Rua .Francisco Martins Feitosa, 535 - Vila Lavínia

Doctrine 
The IPG is a Pentecostal denomination. It affirms the doctrine of Trinity, Continuity, and the Five Ministries Vision. In this view, the church affirms that it is necessary for the church to have contemporary apostles (and therefore the church is included in the Apostolic Restoration Movement), in addition to teachers, pastors, prophets and evangelists. This makes the denomination completely different from traditional Presbyterian denominations.

The church uses a boat as its symbol and the slogan Ministry of Peace. The church does not own and does not subscribe to any of the historical confessions of faith of Presbyterianism such as the Westminster Confession of Faith which is the official confession of faith of the Presbyterian Church of Brazil, Igreja Presbiteriana Independente do Brasil, Conservative Presbyterian Church in Brazil, Fundamentalist Presbyterian Church in Brazil and United Presbyterian Church of Brazil and is one of the hallmarks of Presbyterianism worldwide.

References 

Pentecostal Presbyterian Denominations in Brazil